Bulbophyllum spathulatum is a species of orchid in the genus Bulbophyllum. The plant is characterized by miniature flowers about 8x4 cm in size, and are a purplish red color.  This plant is typically found in tropical climates at elevations of 1,000 to 2,000 meters, particularly in Asia.

References
The Bulbophyllum-Checklist
The Internet Orchid Species Photo Encyclopedia

spathulatum